Sten-Olof Bolldén (16 June 1914 – 27 August 1940) was a Swedish swimmer. He competed in the men's 4 × 200 metre freestyle relay at the 1936 Summer Olympics.

References

External links
 

1914 births
1940 deaths
Olympic swimmers of Sweden
Swimmers at the 1936 Summer Olympics
Swimmers from Stockholm
Swedish male freestyle swimmers
Victims of aviation accidents or incidents in 1940